The Defence School of Transport (DST) Leconfield is located at Normandy Barracks, Leconfield near Beverley, East Riding of Yorkshire in England.

It is a tri-service organisation which forms part of the Defence College of Logistics Policing and Administration. It teaches driver and transport management training to personnel from the British Army, Royal Air Force and Royal Marines.

The site was formerly RAF Leconfield which closed in 1977 when the Army School of Mechanical Transport moved in. The school was renamed the Defence School of Transport in 1996, when it took on responsibility for training personnel of all three British armed forces.

History

Background 
Prior to 1964, army driver training was the responsibility of 6 Driver Training Battalion at Yeovil in Somerset and 15 Driver Training Battalion at Blandford in Dorset, both of the Royal Army Service Corps (RASC). In 1965, the role was transferred to the newly formed Royal Corps of Transport (RCT) where the majority of army drivers were trained in various training establishments, one of the largest being 12 Driver Training Regiment based at Aldershot.

The Army School of Mechanical Transport was formed on 1 April 1977 from a reorganisation of army driver training. The training headquarters and its Mechanical Transport Wing, along with 12 Driver Training Regiment RCT, 401 troop RCT based at South Cerney and previously separate vehicle training elements of the Royal Armoured Corps, Royal Artillery, Royal Corps of Signals, Army Air Corps and Royal Army Ordnance Corps all moved to the site of RAF Leconfield, which had closed as Royal Air Force station on 1 January 1977.

Establishment 
In 1996, the school was renamed the Defence School of Transport when it became responsible for training personnel in the British Army, Royal Air Force and Royal Marines.

The school was awarded the freedom of the East Riding by the East Riding of Yorkshire Council in 2010.

In July 2013, the demolition of existing accommodation blocks began to allow the construction of four new blocks. The £28 million project, carried out by Lendlease on behalf of the Defence Infrastructure Organisation (DIO), was completed in March 2015 and provided 768 bed spaces for students.

25 Regiment of the Royal Logistic Corps relocated to DST in Summer 2019. This move consolidated the regiment in one location with the regimental headquarters and 109 Squadron moving from Deepcut Barracks in Surrey to Leconfield, where 110 Squadron had been based for some years.

Units 
The following units are based at Normandy Barracks.

Defence School of Transport
Communication Information Systems (CIS) Squadron
Driver Training Squadron (DTS)
Military Driver Training Squadron (MDTS)
Specialist Training & Management Squadron (STMS)
25 Training Regiment, Royal Logistic Corps
109 Training Squadron
110 Training Squadron

Role and operations

The Defence School of Transport (DST) is a tri-service organisation which forms part of the Defence College of Logistics Policing and Administration. It teaches driver and transport management training to personnel from the British Army, Royal Air Force and Royal Marines. It is the world’s largest residential training establishment for fleet management and driver training and provides 150 different courses on transport matters for nearly 20,000 trainees a year, with the ability to train up to 1,500 at any one time. It has a fleet of approximately 1,300 vehicles ranging from cars, vans and trucks to mechanical handling equipment and specialised military vehicles.

The Driver Training Squadron (DTS) provides training so personnel can obtain the most common driving licence categories (Cat B, C, C+E, D and D1). The Military Driver Training Squadron (MDTS) provides driver training on military wheeled platforms such as the Land Rover Wolf and Snatch Land Rover, MAN Support Vehicles (6 and 9 tonne) and the Demountable Rack Offload and Pickup System (DROPS). The squadron also provides Basic Close Combat Skills (BCCS) and Anti-Ambush tactics to Royal Logistic Corps (RLC) troops. 

The Communication Information Systems (CIS) Squadron provides training to all regular and reserve Combat Service Support Arms such as the Royal Logistic Corps, Royal Army Medical Corps, Royal Military Police (RMP) and Royal Electrical and Mechanical Engineers. Training on a range of specialist vehicles and systems, such as the Bandvagn 206 all-terrain carrier and quad bikes is provided by the Specialist Training and (MT) Management Squadron (STMS). The Squadron also provides classroom based training on policy, legislation, MT accounting, the carriage of dangerous goods and hazardous materials.

25 Regiment RLC administers and manages the transition of all RLC drivers from basic training into their chosen career trade and ensures that basic soldier skills are maintained.

Facilities 
As well as the Leconfield site, there are ten satellite facilities in the south of England and a further site at Catterick in the north of England.

The school has  of road training circuits which includes roundabouts, traffic lights, junctions, a manoeuvring area with parking bays and a purpose built 1 in 8 sloped hill. Training also takes place on local public roads. Parts of the training areas reflect conditions which would be encountered on deployment in locations such as Afghanistan.

166,000 trees were planted to create five woodlands which are used for training in concealment and camouflage.

References

External links
Official Website

East Riding of Yorkshire
Training establishments of the British Army
Royal Logistic Corps
British Army
Royal Air Force
Naval education and training in the United Kingdom
Royal Marines
Driver's education